Jort van Gennep (born 6 August 1994) is a Dutch rower. He competed in the men's lightweight coxless four event at the 2016 Summer Olympics.

References

External links
 

1994 births
Living people
Dutch male rowers
Olympic rowers of the Netherlands
Rowers at the 2016 Summer Olympics
Place of birth missing (living people)